Jalan FELDA Besout, Federal Route 1154, is a Federal Land Development Authority (FELDA) road in Perak, Malaysia. The Kilometre Zero is located at Terolak.

At most sections, the Federal Route 1154 was built under the JKR R5 road standard, with a speed limit of 90 km/h.

List of junctions

Malaysian Federal Roads